
Year 541 (DXLI) was a common year starting on Tuesday of the Julian calendar. In the Roman Empire, it was known as the Year of the Consulship of Basilius without colleague (or, less frequently, year 1294 Ab urbe condita). Basilius was the last person to be officially appointed Roman consul, since after this year, the office was permanently merged with the office of Roman/Byzantine emperor. Thus, from the next year forward, the consular year dating was abandoned. The denomination 541 for this year has been used since the early medieval period, when the Anno Domini calendar era became the prevalent method in Europe for naming years.

Events 
 By place 

 Byzantine Empire 
 January 1 – Anicius Faustus Albinus Basilius is appointed as consul in Constantinople, the last person to hold this office.
 Plague of Justinian: Bubonic plague appears suddenly in the Egyptian port of Pelusium, spreading to Alexandria and, the following year, to Constantinople. This is the beginning of a 200-year-long pandemic that will devastate Europe, the Middle East, and North Africa.
 Emperor Justinian I recalls Belisarius from Italy to handle the situation in Armenia. He arrives in Upper Mesopotamia and attacks the fortress city of Nisbis. After an unsuccessful siege he ravages the countryside.
 John the Cappadocian, praetorian prefect of the East, is dismissed by the Byzantine empress Theodora for treason. He is banished to Cyzicus, and his estates are confiscated.

 Europe 
 Autumn – Totila is elected king by the Ostrogothic nobles after the death of his uncle Ildibad. He wins the support of the lower classes by liberating slaves and distributing land to the peasants.
 Winter – Siege of Verona: Totila defends the city of Verona against a numerically superior Byzantine army. He gains control over the Po Valley and prepares a Gothic offensive in Central Italy.

 Persia 
 Lazic War: King Khosrau I intervenes in Lazica (modern Georgia), and supports the weakened king Gubazes II against a full-scale uprising. He sends an expeditionary force under Mermeroes and captures the Byzantine stronghold of Petra, located on the coast of the Black Sea, which provides the Persians a strategic port.

 Asia 
 The Uyghurs come under the rule of the Hephthalites (approximate date).

 By topic 

 Religion 
 Jacob Baradaeus becomes bishop of Edessa (approximate date).

Births 
 July 21 – Emperor Wen of Sui, emperor of the Sui Dynasty (d. 604)

Deaths 
 Adhurgunbadh, Persian general
 John Tzibus, Byzantine governor-merchant in Lazica
 Eraric, king of the Ostrogoths
 Ildibad, king of the Ostrogoths

References